Winnie Delma Mapangou (born 27 August 1993), known as Winie Mapangou, is a Gabonese footballer who plays as a forward for French Division 2 Féminine club Stade Brestois 29 and captains the Gabon women's national team.

International career
Mapangou capped for Gabon at senior level during the 2010 African Women's Championship qualification (preliminary round).

International goals
Scores and results list Gabon's goal tally first

References

1993 births
Living people
Sportspeople from Libreville
Gabonese women's footballers
Women's association football forwards
Gabon women's international footballers
Gabonese expatriate footballers
Gabonese expatriate sportspeople in France
Expatriate women's footballers in France
Grenoble Foot 38 (women) players
21st-century Gabonese people